Below is a list of members of the Constituent Assembly of Namibia, which became the National Assembly of Namibia upon independence in March 1990. Individual members were selected by political parties voted for in the 1989 election, the first democratic, multi-racial and universal franchise elections in Namibian history.

The seat distribution per party was as follows:
 South West Africa People's Organization (SWAPO): 41
 Democratic Turnhalle Alliance (DTA): 21
 United Democratic Front (UDF): 4
 Action Christian National (ACN): 3
 Namibia National Front (NNF): 1
 Namibia Patriotic Front (NPF): 1
 Federal Convention of Namibia (FCN): 1

Members 
The following people were elected to the Constituent Assembly:

SWAPO 

 Matti Amadhila
 Solomon Amadhila
 Ben Amathila
 Libertina Amathila
 Nahas Angula
 Helmut Ausiku
 Niko Bessinger (1948–2008)
 Willem Biwa
 Daniel Botha
 Jerry Ekandjo
 Moses ǁGaroëb (1942–1997)
 Hage Geingob – Third President of Namibia
 Theo-Ben Gurirab (1938–2018)
 Hidipo Hamutenya (1939–2016)
 Marco Hausiku
 Hadino Hishongwa
 Joshua Hoebeb
 Michaela Hübschle
 Pendukeni Iivula-Ithana
 Nickey Iyambo (1936–2019)
 Richard Kapelwa Kabajani (1943–2007)
 Zephania Kameeta
 Peter Katjavivi
 Willem Konjore
 Nathaniel Maxuilili (1927–1999)
 Kaire Mbuende
 Nangolo Mbumba
 David Meroro
 Peter Mweshihange (1930–1998)
 Kapuka Nauyala
 Sam Nujoma – First President of Namibia
 John Ya Otto (1938–1994)
 Hifikepunye Pohamba – Second President of Namibia
 Hartmut Ruppel
 Pashukeni Shoombe
 Ngarikutuke Tjiriange
 Mose Penaani Tjitendero (1943–2006) – Speaker
 Andimba Toivo ya Toivo (1924–2017)
 Peter Tsheehama (1941–2010)
 Ben Ulenga
 Buddy Wentworth (1937–2014)
 Anton von Wietersheim
 Hendrik Witbooi (1934–2009)
 Siegfried Wohler

DTA 

 Ben Africa
 Leonard Barnes
 Magareth Barnes
 Gabriel Dan
 Johannes J ǀGaseb
 Allois Gende
 Joseph Haraseb
 Jeremia Jagger
 Petrus Junius
 Geelboy Kashe
 Katuutire Kaura
 Constance Kgosiemang (1940–2012)
 Fanuel Kozonguizi (1932–1995)
 Daniel Luipert 
 A. Majavero
 Andrew Matjila
 Dirk Mudge
 Mishake Muyongo
 A. Nuule
 Hans-Erik Staby (1935–2009)
 C. van Wyk

UDF 
 Justus ǁGaroëb
 Reggie Diergaardt
 Eric Biwa
 Theophelus Soroseb

ACN 
 Kosie Pretorius (1935–2017)
 Jan de Wet (1927–2012)
 Walter Aston

NNF 
 Vekuii Rukoro

NPF 
 Moses Katjioungua (1942–2011)

FCN 
 Johannes Diergaardt (1927–1998); resigned shortly after being elected and was replaced by Mburumba Kerina

References

History of Namibia
Constituent Assembly members